Zaandam is a city in the province of North Holland, Netherlands. It is the main city of the municipality of Zaanstad, and received city rights in 1811. It is located on the river Zaan, just north of Amsterdam.

The statistical district Zaandam, which encompasses both the city and the surrounding countryside, has about 76,804 residents. Zaandam was a separate municipality until 1974, when it became a part of the new municipality of Zaanstad.

History
The history of Zaandam (formerly called Saenredam) and the surrounding Zaan River region (the Zaanstreek) is intimately tied to industry. In the Dutch Golden Age, Zaandam served as a large milling centre. Thousands of windmills powered saws that processed Scandinavian wood for the shipbuilding and paper industries. A statue that commemorates this industry was commissioned from sculptor Slavomir Miletić, and the statue, De houtwerker ("The Woodworker"), was installed on 20 June 2004.

Zaandam is historically linked with the whaling industry.

In 1697, Tsar Peter I of Russia spent some time in Zaandam, where he studied shipbuilding. He stayed in a little wooden house built in 1632, but was soon forced to leave because he attracted too much attention from the local population; he moved to Amsterdam, where he studied at one of the wharves of the Dutch East India Company. The wooden house he stayed was preserved and turned into a museum, the Czar Peter House. A statue honoring him was placed on the nearby Dam Square in 1911, and was declared a Rijksmonument.

In 1871, the impressionist painter Claude Monet lived in Zaandam for approximately half a year. During that time, he made 25 paintings of the area, including Houses on the Achterzaan, Bateaux en Hollande pres de Zaandam and A windmill at Zaandam.

Economy
The first European McDonald's restaurant opened in Zaandam in 1971. The Albert Heijn supermarket chain (founded in nearby Oostzaan in 1887), now grown into the  Ahold Delhaize retail company, is headquartered in Zaandam. Chocolate manufacturer Verkade also hails from Zaandam. There were 6,910 business establishments in Zaandam in 2019. 
 
Football club AZ (Alkmaar Zaanstreek) was founded in Zaandam on May 10, 1967.

Transport
There are two railway stations in Zaandam: Zaandam railway station and Zaandam Kogerveld railway station. Plans exist by the province of North Holland to extend the Amsterdam Metro to Zaandam.

Gallery

Notable people 

 Han Bennink (born 1942), jazz musician
 Pieter Bleeker (1819–1878), ichthyologist
 Kees Bruynzeel (1900–1980), wood merchant
 Ali Bouali (born 1981), rapper
 Dirk Andries Flentrop (1910—2003), organ builder
 Niels Heithuis (born 1972), journalist and radio presenter
 Piet Kee (born 1927–2018), organist and composer
 Erwin Koeman (born 1961), football player and football coach
 Ronald Koeman (born 1963), football player and football coach
 Hendrik Lenstra (born 1947), mathematician
 Anton Mauve (1838–1888), painter
 Robert Molenaar (born 1969), football player
 Oğuzhan Özyakup (born 1992), football player
 Kathinka Pasveer (born 1959), flautist
 Johnny Rep (born 1951), football player
 Jan Saenredam (1565–1607), copperplate engraver
 Harm van den Dorpel (born 1981), conceptual artist
 Patricia van der Vliet (born 1989), model
 Elisabeth van Houts (born 1952), historian
 Jan Verkade (1868–1946), painter
 Arie Smit (born 1916–2016), painter
 Melissa Venema  (born 1995),  musician
 Owen Wijndal (born 1999), professional footballer

References

External links

 
Cities in the Netherlands
Former municipalities of North Holland
Populated places in North Holland
Zaanstad